The Malavettuvan is one of the tribal communities in the Kasaragod district of Kerala state, India.They are called vettuvans, because they were experts in hunting.

References

People from Kasaragod district